Bessonovsky (masculine), Bessonovskaya (feminine), or Bessonovskoye (neuter) is the name of several rural localities in Russia:
Bessonovsky, Oryol Oblast, a settlement in Suryaninsky Selsoviet of Bolkhovsky District of Oryol Oblast
Bessonovsky, Perm Krai, a cordon in Permsky District of Perm Krai